The Twelve Chairs is a 1971 Soviet comedy film directed by Leonid Gaidai. It is an adaptation of Ilf and Petrov's 1928 novel The Twelve Chairs.

Plot 
Ostap Bender, shortly after arriving in Stargorod, meets Ippolit "Kisa" Vorobyaninov, a Marshal of Nobility who's looking for a set of 12 chairs that belonged to his mother-in-law, who on her deathbed confesses of hiding diamonds in one of them. However, the confession is overheard by Father Fyodor, who is also looking for them. Ostap and Kisa decide to go on the search together, traveling all around Russia and having a series of misadventures.

Cast
 Archil Gomiashvili as Ostap Bender (voiced by Yuri Sarantsev; singing voice by Valeri Zolotukhin; in some scenes speaks in his own voice)
 Sergey Filippov as Ippolit Matveyevich "Kisa" Vorobyaninov
 Mikhail Pugovkin as Father Fyodor, priest
 Natalya Krachkovskaya as Madame Gritsatsuyeva
 Igor Yasulovich as Ernest Shchukin, engineer 
 Natalya Vorobyova as Ellochka Shchukina, Ernest Shchukin's wife
 Klara Rumyanova as Katerina Aleksandrovna, Father Fyodor's wife
 Natalya Varley as Yelizaveta "Liza" Petrovna (voiced by Nadezhda Rumyantseva)
 Georgy Vitsin as fitter Mechnikov
 Savely Kramarov as one-eyed chess player
Radner Muratov as first chess player
 Viktor Pavlov as Kolya, Liza's husband
 Gotlib Roninson as chairman Kislyarsky
 Roman Filippov as poet Nikifor Lyapis-Trubetskoy
 Grigory Shpigel as Aleksandr Yakovlevich
 Yuri Nikulin as janitor Tikhon
 Glikeriya Bogdanova-Chesnokova as Yelena Stanislavovna Bour
 Vladimir Etush as Andrei Bruns
Nina Grebeshkova as Musik, Bruns' wife
Alexander Khvylya as Vakkhanyuk
Nina Agapova as soloist of theater "Kolumb"
Rina Zelyonaya as editor of youth problem magazine "Groom and Bride"
Irina Murzaeva as guide of furniture craftsmanship museum
Yevdokiya Urusova as Klavdiya Ivanovna Petukhova, Kisa's mother-in-law
Erast Garin as theater critic
 Leonid Gaidai as Varfolomey Korobeinikov (uncredited)
 Rostislav Plyatt as Narrator (uncredited)
Stanislav Sadalsky as fireman in theater "Kolumb" (uncredited)

References

External links 

 

1971 comedy films
1971 films
Films about con artists
Films based on Russian novels
Films directed by Leonid Gaidai
Films scored by Aleksandr Zatsepin
Films set in 1927
Films set in Russia
Films set in the Soviet Union
Films shot in Baku
Films shot in Moscow
Films shot in the North Caucasus
Films shot in Yaroslavl Oblast
Films with live action and animation 

Ilf and Petrov
Mosfilm films
Russian comedy films
Soviet comedy films
1970s Russian-language films